Denisse Aracely Ahumada Riquelme (born 8 April 1993) is a Chilean professional racing cyclist, who currently rides for UCI Women's Continental Team . She rode in the women's road race at the 2019 UCI Road World Championships in Yorkshire, England.

Major results

2015
 1st  Road race, National Road Championships
2019
 National Road Championships
1st  Road race
2nd Time trial
 2nd  Road race, Pan American Road Championships
 4th Road race, Pan American Games
 7th Overall Vuelta Femenina a Guatemala

References

External links

1993 births
Living people
Chilean female cyclists
Place of birth missing (living people)
Cyclists at the 2019 Pan American Games
Pan American Games competitors for Chile
21st-century Chilean women